The Freikörperkultur (FKK) is a social and health culture that originated in the German Empire; its beginnings were historically part of the Lebensreform social movement in the late 19th century. The Freikörperkultur, which translates to free body culture, consists in the connection of health aspects of being naked in light, air and sun with intentions to reform life and society. It is partially identical with the culture of nudity, naturism and nudism in the sense of communal nudity of people and families in leisure time, sport and everyday life.

By the 20th century the culture of communal open air nudity in the "great outdoors" and its benefits to public health blossomed in Germany as an alternative to the stresses and anxieties of industrialised, urban life. Today, there are only few legal restrictions on public nudity in Germany. Under the terms "naturism" and "nudism", it is now internationally widespread, with associations and designated public recreational environments in numerous countries in Europe, North and South America, Australia, Africa, Asia and the Caribbean; the largest distribution is still found in German-speaking countries and Scandinavia.

In general

Definition
Freikörperkultur-inspired naturism is defined as an attitude and way of life by the International Naturist Federation as follows:

Content
Behind the Freikörperkultur movement is an attitude towards life, according to which the naked body is no reason for feelings of shame. The communally practiced nudity of the Freikörperkultur is often experienced in this sense as liberating and goes hand in hand with mutual acceptance and a positive body image. The focus is on enjoying nature, being nude or the realization of freedom. The nudity of naturism has no sexual relation. Nudity on the beach and in water, in comparison to wearing swimsuits, is accompanied with a different body surface sensation, which is mostly experienced as pleasant. In the sense of nudity propagated by the Freikörperkultur it does not address sexuality and is not directly related to it.

In the context of the Freikörperkultur, mostly bathing, sunbathing on bathing lakes or beaches (the "nudist beaches"), sports and other leisure activities are practiced nude. In numerous designated holiday resorts, campsites, country parks and sports club facilities the praxis of the Freikörperkultur are also applied. Nudists and naturists are organized in national and international nudist or naturism associations.

Nudity in intimate situations, as well as purely practical nudity such as in the shower or in the sauna, do not involve the Freikörperkultur. This nudity does not require a special group consensus.

History

By far the most extensive collection on the historical and current situation of the Freikörperkultur (Naturism), the "International Naturist Library" (formerly the Damm - Baunatal Collection), is located in the Lower Saxony Institute for Sports History in Hanover, Germany.

Background
In public bathhouses, even in the Middle Ages, people bathed in the nude, although moral or (with regard to disease transmission) medical concerns were occasionally expressed. In many parts of central Europe up until the 18th century, people bathed naked in rivers and lakes, albeit often separated by gender. Beginning in the late 18th century, public nudity became increasingly taboo, which was never enforced in the sparsely populated Scandinavia. At the same time, the Scottish judge Lord Monboddo (1714–1779) practised and preached unclothed "air-baths" for health and as a revival of Ancient Greek attitudes toward nudity. It found literary mention in Georg Christoph Lichtenberg's (1742–1799) book Das Luftbad (the air-bath).

As early as 1853 the Swiss naturopath Arnold Rikli founded a "solar sanatorium" (Sonnenheilanstalt) and prescribed his patients the heliotherapy of unclothed outdoor "light-baths" (Lichtbäder) as a treatment for tuberculosis, rickets, seasonal affective disorder and other health or skin disorders. In 1906 there were also 105 so-called "air-bath" sanatoriums (Luftbäder) in Germany; unclothed exposure to outdoor air, as a treatment for long-term stay in unventilated, warm rooms which leads to softening, heat build-up in the body, headaches, nausea and circulatory disorders. The idea of the therapeutic unclothed air-bath, was connected with that of the light-bath, in the early 20th century, for example by the pastor and naturopath Emanuel Felke.

The painter and social reformer Karl Wilhelm Diefenbach (1851–1913), who practiced Freikörperkultur with his students in the Höllriegelskreuth hermitage near Munich and later on the Himmelhof near Vienna, is considered the real pioneer of naturism, namely outside of clinical-medical treatments.

"Nude culture" and the Life-reform (Lebensreform) movement – up to World War I

In 1898 the first official Freikörperkultur (FKK) association was founded in Essen, Germany. Around 1900, nude bathing in the Berlin area and on the German North and Baltic Sea coast became more popular. A few years earlier, common bathing in public—even in the swimsuits of that time period—had been officially banned or was considered immoral in many places.

With political liberalization, conservative circles challenged the nude bathing which had become popular among urban intellectuals, seeing them as a corruption of morality.

Naturism between World War I and World War II

After the First World War, Freikörperkultur (FKK) associations were increasing in Germany. After the first official nudist beach on Sylt Island was established in Germany in 1920, most of the FKK-associations joined together in 1923 to form the "Arbeitsgemeinschaft der Bünde deutscher Lichtkämpfer" (Working Group of the Leagues for German Light Campaigners) and from 1925 published in Berlin a monthly journal called "Leben und Sonne" (Life and Sun); from 1926 the working group renamed to "Reichsverband für Freikörperkultur" (Imperial Association for Free Body Culture). The socialist groups united separately under the name  "Freie Menschen. Bund für sozialistische Lebensgestaltung und Freikörperkultur" (Free People. Association for socialist Lifestyle and Free Body Culture) with (1932) approx. 70,000 members. In 1930 representatives from England, the Netherlands, France, Austria, Switzerland, Hungary, Italy and Germany met in Frankfurt am Main and later founded a European league for Naturism. The first dissertation about the FKK movement was written in the 1930s.

In 1933 after the Nazi Party came to power, nudist organizations were initially banned or integrated into Nazi organizations.

{{Quotation|One of the greatest dangers for German culture and morality is the so-called nudity movement. Greatly as it is to be welcomed in the interest of the public health, that ever wider circles, especially of the metropolitan population, are striving to make the healing power of sun and air and water serviceable to their body, as greatly must the so-called nudity movement be disapproved of as a cultural error. Among women the nudity kills natural modesty; it takes from men their respect for women, and thereby destroys the prerequisite for any genuine culture. It is therefore expected of all police authorities that, in support of the spiritual powers developed through the national movement, they take all police measures to destroy the so-called nude culture. Hermann Göring, 1933 Nazi edict}}
 
On 3 March 1933, the Prussian Ministry of Interior issued a circular to "combat the nudist movement". But with former German military officer, manager and instructor at the German Army School of Physical Education in Wünsdorf—, the Reich Minister of Food and Agriculture Walter Darré and, in the end, with strength in the paramilitary SS, the Freikörperkultur found new supporters again. Some sources state that Himmler and the SS supported Naturism. The first naturist Olympic Games took place in Thielle in Switzerland in August 1939. In the German Reich, the ban on nude bathing was relaxed by the Reich Ordinance of 10 July 1942, when nobody had to see it (valid in the West Germany until the 1960s, in East Germany until 1990). During the National Socialist era there was also a "racial nude culture", the best-known representative of which was the sport campaigner and author Hans Surén, who glorified body ideals of the National Socialist's, and would later become honorary member of the Deutscher Verband für Freikörperkultur (DFK) (German Association for Free Body Culture). In 1940 the first color picture books appeared with depictions of martial nudity, such as by the sculptor Arno Breker.

 From 1945 to present 

In 1949, the Deutscher Verband für Freikörperkultur (DFK) (German Association for Free Body Culture) was founded, which today is a member of the German Olympic Sports Confederation (DOSB) with special tasks for popular sports in nude recreation and the largest member of the International Naturist Federation (INF).

The first naturist holiday resorts were opened around 1950 in France (Centre-Hélio-Marin in Montalivet-les-Bains, Aquitaine, France).

The nude beach in Kampen on the island of Sylt in Germany was particularly popular due to extensive media coverage. FKK resorts in Yugoslavia, France and on the Baltic Seacoast became popular holiday places. Naturist organizations gained many new members in the 1960s.

FKK-inspired naturism in Germany continued to be particularly popular in East Germany after the Second World War, possibly because of a more secular cultural development. It had ties to the workers' movement and became a symbol for people and families to escape a repressive state. Beach culture was often intermixed – nude and dressed people would swim together and nudity was widely tolerated and considered neither unusual nor sensational. In the later decades of the 20th century, naturism became very popular outside Germany. 

One popular form of Freikörperkultur recreation is Nacktwanderung, translated as Nude hiking'', where a walking group will collectively tour through the open countryside, which is possible in Germany due to the liberal laws on non-sexual public nudity. This attitude does extend to Austria, where FKK culture enjoys a high degree of public acceptance, but not to the German-speaking cantons of Switzerland where nude recreation is usually regulated to designated FKK outdoor public spaces.

Switzerland
In general, public nudity is not forbidden in Switzerland: there is no law that says you are not allowed to leave the house without clothes, as long as the nudity is not sexually motivated. However, the jurisprudence in Switzerland varies from canton to canton. In response to an influx of German FKK enthusiasts crossing the Alps, the Swiss canton of Appenzell Innerrhoden, which became a popular destination for its tourist hiking trails, passed a local act in 2009 explicitly prohibiting nude hiking in outdoor public spaces. Local regulatory authorities imposed fines of 200 Swiss francs for "being naked in public", which some nude ramblers refused to pay.

Two avid nude ramblers from the neighbouring Swiss canton of Appenzell Ausserrhoden, where there is no strict ban on nude hiking, appealed the fines at the Federal Supreme Court of Switzerland, but the case was dismissed in 2011 with the verdict "The cantons can fine naked hikers. It is true that nude hiking is not covered by the penal code. But the cantons are authorized to ban and punish non-sexually motivated nudity."

In a 2012 protest event covered by Swiss news reporters, a naked 28-year-old Austrian broke away from his paragliding tandem partner around 700 meters above the ground and landed with his parachute in Wasserauen (Appenzell Innerrhoden), the faces of the naturist flyer and his helper, the Swiss "nude alpine hiking professional" known by the pseudonym Puistola Grottenpösch (with a fig leaf) who is also considered the mouthpiece of Swiss nude hikers, were made unrecognizable in the press coverage; no complaint was filed, said the Appenzell Innerrhoden public prosecutor. The man would be fined if we found out who he was. Since the Federal Supreme Court of Switzerland verdict, the Swiss canton of Appenzell Innerrhoden has seen no more trace of nude hikers.

See also
Social nudity
Naturism in Germany 
Naturism
Lotte Herrlich (1883–1956) is regarded as the most important female photographer of German naturism
Richard Ungewitter early pioneer of the German Freikörperkultur movement
Adolf Koch early pioneer of the German Freikörperkultur movement
Bess Mensendieck early pioneer of the German feminist Freikörperkultur movement
Indiaca The FKK Indiaca/ Peteca sport tournament in Germany

References

External links
 www.DFK.org "Deutscher Verband für Freikörperkultur", earliest & largest German NGO for FKK
 www.inf-fni.org INF-FNI, International Naturist Federation

Naturism
Naturism in Germany

de:Freikörperkultur